The Eyak (Eyak: ʔi·ya·ɢdəlahɢəyu·, literally "inhabitants of Eyak Village at Mile 6") are a Native American indigenous group historically located on the Copper River Delta and near the town of Cordova, Alaska. Today, Eyak people live in Cordova, Yakutat, across Alaska, and the U.S. Many of them do not qualify to be tribal members in the native village of Eyak, a federally recognized Alaska Native tribe which was established through the Alaska Native Claims Settlement Act in 1971. This is due to the enrollment qualifications that extend tribal membership only to those who reside in the town of Cordova for the majority of the year.

Territory
The Eyak's territory reached from present day Cordova east to the Martin River and north to Miles Glacier.

There were four main villages:
Alaganik, near Mile 21 of the present day Copper River Highway
Eyak, located near Mile 5.5
unnamed, 800 yards south of Eyak
Orca, located within present day Cordova
In addition to these villages the Eyak would seasonally occupy fish camps at Point Whitshed and Mountain Slough.

The now-common name Eyak for both the ethnic group and its language is an exonym and comes from the Sugt'stun (Alutiit'stun) dialect of Chugach Sugpiaq, a group of Sugpiaq ("real people," better known as Alutiiq) for an Eyak village as Igya'aq' at the mouth of the Eyak River.

The Eyak refer to themselves as dAXunhyuu ("the people") and the present-day Eyak Native Village as iiyaaGdaad' ("at Eyak Native Village") - but the now officially recognized tribe as iiyaaGdAlahGAyuu ("People from Eyak Native Village"), as the tribe consists of descendants of Chugach Sugpiaq, Eyak, and Tlingit.

History
The Eyak initially moved out of the interior down the Copper River to the coast. There they harvested the rich salmon fishing grounds. When the Russians arrived they recognized the Eyak as a distinct culture and described their territory on their maps. They also traded with the Eyak and sent them missionaries. Because of their small population, they were often raided and their territory boundaries were under pressure from the Chugach to the west. The Tlingit on the east side, had better relations with the Eyak leading to intermarriage and the assimilation of most Eyak. The Eyak's territorial boundary was pushed further contributing to the Eyak's decline. When the Americans arrived they opened canneries and competed with the Eyak for salmon. The integration and novel diseases which were introduced by non-native settlers led to the further decline of the Eyak.

As populations decreased the remaining Eyak began to congregate near the village of Orca. In 1880 the population of the village of Alaganik was recorded at 117 and by 1890 it had declined to 48. In 1900 total population was estimated at 60. As more settlers arrived the last village became the town of Cordova. As of 1996, there were 120 partial Eyak descendants in the town. The last full-blood Eyak, Marie Smith Jones, died on January 21, 2008.

Language

The Eyak spoke a distinct language closely related to the Athabaskan languages. Pressure from neighboring ethnic groups and the spread of English resulted in a decline of the Eyak language. Marie Smith Jones (1918–2008) was the last native speaker. Michael Krauss was known first and foremost as an Eyak language specialist.

Shamanism

Notable Eyak people
 Marie Smith Jones, last fluent speaker of traditional Eyak language

References

Further reading
Birket-Smith, K., & De Laguna, F. (1938). The Eyak Indians of the Copper River Delta, Alaska. København: Levin & Munksgaard, E. Munksgaard.
De Laguna, F. (1990).  "Eyak."  In  Handbook of North American Indians, Vol. 7 Northwest Coast.  W. Suttles, ed. Pp. 189–96.  Washington D.C.: Smithsonian Institution Press.
Harry, A. N., & Krauss, M. E. (1982). In honor of Eyak: The art of Anna Nelson Harry. Fairbanks, Alaska: Alaska Native Language Center, University of Alaska.
Hund, Andrew. "Eyak." 2004. Encyclopedia of the Arctic. Taylor and Francis Publications. 
Hund, Andrew. 2008. "’Old Man Dude’ and Eyak Shamanism" Alaska Historical Society ~ University of Alaska's Statehood Conference, Alaska Visionaries: Seekers, Leaders, and Dreamers. Anchorage, AK. Unpublished manuscript.

External links
Eyak Preservation Council
Eyak Revitalization Project
Native Village of Eyak
Eyak Corporation
Alaska Native Heritage Center

Alaska Native ethnic groups
Native American tribes in Alaska